Jalan Bolok–Mempaga, Federal Route 1500 (formerly Pahang state route C124), is a federal road in Pahang, Malaysia.

At most sections, the Federal Route 1500 was built under the JKR R5 road standard, allowing maximum speed limit of up to 90 km/h.

List of junctions

Malaysian Federal Roads
Roads in Pahang